Minot station is a train station in Minot, North Dakota served by Amtrak, the national railroad passenger system. The station is located at the site of the former Great Northern Railway station, adjacent to the Minot Public Library, and close to Minot's City Hall and Downtown Minot.

Minot is a service stop for Amtrak's daily Empire Builder, which also serves six other cities in North Dakota. This is the only scheduled service stop between Minneapolis, Minnesota and Havre, Montana. The Minot station features the most boardings and detrainings of any Amtrak station in the state. 

The station was built in 1905 by the Great Northern Railway. It originally featured a brick exterior and a gabled roof. In 1975, the station was modernized; a stucco exterior and a flat roofline drastically altered the appearance of the depot. According to Great American Stations, the Amtrak Depot Restoration Committee used federal, state and city funds to renovate the station in recent years. In 2008, the brick exterior and gabled roof were restored, while the renovation of the interior was completed in Fall 2010. However, flooding in the summer of 2011 damaged the interior of the main waiting room, which was then closed for repairs. A small temporary waiting room was opened in early Nov 2011 for Empire Builder passengers to use until the main waiting room was repaired. 

In fall 2012, Amtrak proceeded with the next round of improvements, including repairs to the waiting room's tile floor and wall paneling. Work was completed by April 2013 and a few weeks later, on National Train Day, the city held an open house at the depot. That September, 15 wood benches were installed in the main waiting room. The Minot Area Community Foundation, which supports both local and national charities and charitable causes, funded the project through a $30,000 grant.

The platform, tracks and station building are all owned by BNSF Railway.

Minot City Transit does not directly serve the station; however, buses travel north-south on both Broadway and 6th Street and may be flagged down at any street corner.

Station layout

Bibliography

Notes and references

External links

Minot Amtrak Station (USA Rail Guide – Train Web)

Amtrak stations in North Dakota
Buildings and structures in Minot, North Dakota
Railway stations in the United States opened in 1893
Former Great Northern Railway (U.S.) stations
1893 establishments in North Dakota